Edward Randolph Emberley (born October 19, 1931) is an American artist and illustrator, best known for children's picture books.

Biography 

Emberley was born in Malden, Massachusetts. He studied art at the Massachusetts School of Art in Boston (now the Massachusetts College of Art and Design), from which he received a Bachelor of Fine Arts degree in painting and illustration. He also studied at the Rhode Island School of Design.

He married Barbara, a librarian and writer, in 1955; they have two children, Rebecca and Michael. Michael is also an illustrator. They currently live in Ipswich, Massachusetts. Rebecca is also a children's books author and illustrator.

Career 

Emberley is best known for his children's book work - particularly instructional drawing books.   Emberley believes that everyone can learn to draw. His drawing books for children feature clear step-by-step instructions employing numbers, letters, and shapes graded to the early elementary school level. For example, the book Ed Emberley's A.B.C. uses this style of instruction, presenting a single letter-based drawing for each letter of the alphabet.

Emberley has illustrated or contributed to over 50 books, many of which were first published between the 1960s and 1980s. Renewed interest in Emberley's work has come from adults who first encountered his books as children and now are purchasing them for their own children. His most recent book, The Red Hen, was released on October 26, 2010; like his preceding work, Chicken Little (2009) it is a collaboration with Rebecca Emberley.

Awards and honors 
Emberley's first book, The Wing on a Flea (1961), was an ALA Notable Book and made the New York Times list of best-illustrated books for that year. He was sole runner-up for the 1967 Caldecott Medal, as illustrator of One Wide River to Cross, written by his wife Barbara Emberley. Next year he won the Medal for another collaboration with Barbara, Drummer Hoff. The award by children's librarians annually recognizes "the most distinguished American picture book or children". Drummer Hoff was also named to the Lewis Carroll Shelf Award list.

Selected works 

A Birthday Wish 1977
Bits and Bytes: A Computer Dictionary for Beginners 1985 (illustrator)
Bye-Bye, Big Bad Bullybug 2007
Chicken Little 2009 (illustrator)
Clothing 1969 (illustrator)
Columbus Day (illustrator)
Drummer Hoff 1968 (illustrator)
Ed Emberley's 6 Nature Adventures 1982
Ed Emberley's ABC 1978
Ed Emberley's Big Green Drawing Book c1979
Ed Emberley's Big Orange Drawing Book c1980
Ed Emberley's Big Purple Drawing Book c1981
Ed Emberley's Big Red Drawing Book c1987
Ed Emberley's Christmas Drawing Book c1987
Ed Emberley's Crazy Mixed-Up Face Game c1981
Ed Emberley's Drawing Book: Make a World 1972
Ed Emberley's Drawing Book of Animals 1970
Ed Emberley's Drawing Book of Faces 1975
Ed Emberley's Drawing Book of Trucks and Trains 2002
Ed Emberley's Fingerprint Drawing Book 2001
Ed Emberley's Great Thumbprint Drawing Book c1977
Ed Emberley's Jumbo Book of Drawing Activities
Ed Emberley's Little Book of Drawing Farms
Ed Emberley's Little Drawing Book of Trains 1973
Ed Emberley's Little Drawing Book of Weirdos 1973
Ed Emberley's Picture Pie 1984
Ed Emberley's Second Drawing Box
Ed Emberley's Three Science Flip Books
Flash, Crash, Rumble and Roll 1985 (illustrator)
First Words: Cars, Boats and Planes
First Words: Sounds
Glad Monster, Sad Monster 1997 (illustrator)
Go Away, Big Green Monster 1993
Green Says Go
How to Talk to Your Computer (illustrator)
If You're a Monster and You Know It... 2010 (illustrator)
Kid-Friendly Computer Book (illustrator)Kid-Friendly Computer Start-Ups (illustrator)
Klippity Klop
Krispin's Fair 1976 (illustrator)
Ladybug, Ladybug, Fly Away Home 1967 (illustrator)
Meet the Computer (illustrator)
Moon Seems to Change (illustrator)
One Wide River to Cross 1967
The Parade Book 1962
Simon's Song (illustrator)
Squiggles, Dots and Lines
Straight Hair, Curly Hair (illustrator)
Suppose You Met a Witch 1973 (illustrator)
Thanks Mom
The Ant and the Grasshopper (illustrator)
The BASIC Book (illustrator)
The Big Dipper 1962 (illustrator)
The Bottom of the Sea 1966 (illustrator)
The Fisherman and his Wife unfinished (illustrator)
The Gallant Tailor unfinished (adaptor and illustrator)
The Lion and the Mice (illustrator)
The Red Hen 2010
The Story of Paul Bunyan 1963 (illustrator)
The Wing on a Flea 1961
The Wizard of Op 1975
There Was an Old Lady unfinished (illustrator)
There Was an Old Monster! 2009 (illustrator)
Three: An Emberley Family Sketchbook 1998
Turtle Talk (illustrator)
Where's My Sweetie Pie? 2010
Yankee Doodle (illustrator)
Rosebud 1966
The Crocodile and the Scorpion
Spare Parts (illustrator)

References

External links
 
 
 

1931 births
American children's writers
Caldecott Medal winners
American children's book illustrators
Massachusetts College of Art and Design alumni
Living people